Coleophora filaginella is a moth of the family Coleophoridae. It is found in Finland, Latvia, Germany and Greece.

The larvae possibly feed on Filago arvensis. They feed on the generative organs of their host plant.

References

filaginella
Moths described in 1881
Moths of Europe